The Way Out (Czech: Cesta ven; French: Je m’en sortirai) is a 2014 Czech-French social drama film directed by Czech director Petr Václav. It premiered at the 2014 Cannes Film Festival. The film won seven Czech Lion awards, including selected Best Czech Film of 2014 and Best Director. According to Variety, The Way Out is a story of a "young gypsy woman trying to lead a 'normal' life [...] in a constant battle against prejudice and her own community's entrenched behavior."

References

External links 
  
 
 Cesta ven at CSFD

2014 films
2010s Czech-language films
Czech drama films
Czech Lion Awards winners (films)
Golden Kingfisher winners
Czech Film Critics' Awards winners
French drama films